Candelero Abajo is a barrio in the municipality of Humacao, Puerto Rico. Its population in 2010 was 5,135.

History
Puerto Rico was ceded by Spain in the aftermath of the Spanish–American War under the terms of the Treaty of Paris of 1898 and became an unincorporated territory of the United States. In 1899, the United States Department of War conducted a census of Puerto Rico finding that the population of Candelero Abajo barrio was 972.

Flood zone
In 2019, updated flood zone maps show that because of its location- where most cyclones enter the island, Humacao is one of the most vulnerable areas of Puerto Rico. Humacao was working on flood mitigation plans and shared that its barrios located on the coast; Antón Ruíz, Punta Santiago, Río Abajo, Buena Vista and Candelero Abajo barrios, are prone to flooding and in danger of being completed destroyed by a hurricane.

See also

 List of communities in Puerto Rico

References

External links

Barrios of Humacao, Puerto Rico